Petra Cabrera-Badia is a Virgin Islander beauty queen who represented her country in the Miss World 2013 pageant held in Bali, Indonesia.

Biography

Early life and career beginnings
Petra was born in Dominican Republic but resided in U.S. Virgin Islands for several years now.
She is working in a medical office support role, she has ambitions of studying Business Administration with a view to starting her own business.

Miss World 2013
Miss World 2013, the 63rd edition of the Miss World pageant was held on September 28, 2013 at Bali Nusa Dua Convention Center in Bali, Indonesia. 127 contestants from all over the world competed, making the biggest turnout in the pageant's history.

When she won in the national competition, Petra got the right to represent U.S Virgin Islands in Miss World. She flew to Indonesia to take part in the said pageant where she was unplaced. During the "Beach Fashion" round in the preliminaries, Petra was able to be part of the Top 32 but she lost to the Brazil's representative, Sancler Frantz.

The 2013 edition was won by Megan Young of the Philippines.

References

Living people
United States Virgin Islands models
United States Virgin Islands beauty pageant winners
Miss World 2013 delegates
Year of birth missing (living people)